, also known as , was a Japanese domain of the Edo period.  It is associated with Hizen Province in modern-day Saga Prefecture.

In the han system, Fukue was a political and economic abstraction based on periodic cadastral surveys and projected agricultural yields.  In other words, the domain was defined in terms of kokudaka, not land area. This was different from the feudalism of the West.

History
Gotō was settled in ancient times, and was a port of call on the trade route between Japan and Tang-dynasty China in the Nara period. Buddhist prelate Kūkai stopped at Gotō in 806. The islands came under the control of the Gotō clan, a local warlord clan specializing in trade and piracy, during the Muromachi period. The area was the center of intense European missionary activity in the late 16th century, which converted most of the population to the Kirishitan (Christian) faith. Gotō Harumasa (1548–1612) served Toyotomi Hideyoshi and participated in the Japanese invasions of Korea. During the Battle of Sekigahara he remained neutral. In 1602, after the start of the Tokugawa bakufu he pledged loyalty to shōgun Tokugawa Ieyasu, and in return was confirmed in his ancestral holdings, with revenues of 15,000 koku.

The early days of the domain were troubled by political problems, with rivalries between different factions of the ruling clan, violent clashes over fishing rights between various islands and villages, and the unpopular suppression of the Kirishitan religion per the Tokugawa bakufu's national seclusion policies. The situation became more quiescent in the 18th century with increasing prosperity due to the growth of whaling and the establishment of the separate Tomiei sub-domain (3000 koku) on Shinkamigotō.

Towards the end of the Bakumatsu period, the 10th daimyō of Fukue Domain, Gotō Moriakira began reconstruction of Ishida Castle, with the work completed by Gotō Morinori, the 11th and final daimyō. It was the last Japanese castle to be built under the Tokugawa Bakufu.

Morinori was an early supporter of the Sonnō jōi movement, and was ordered to Kyoto in October 1867 to pledge his loyalty to Emperor Meiji. He arrived in Kyoto in 1868, and the new Meiji government ordered him to strengthen the maritime defenses of his island domain against possible incursions by foreign ships. To defray the costs of this program, the new government abolished the subsidiary fief of Tomie, and added its 3000 koku to his revenues. However, the people of Tomie were highly opposed to the union with Fukue, and it was not until July 1869 that he was able to take possession of the new territories. By this time, the position of daimyō had already been abolished, and his official title was "domain governor".

On July 15, 1871, Fukue domain was abolished with the rest of the han system, and became part of the new Nagasaki Prefecture.

The former Gotō domain is now part of Gotō city, Nagasaki Prefecture.

List of daimyō 
The hereditary daimyōs were head of the clan and head of the domain.  They were descendants of Gotō Iemori

 Gotō clan, 1603–1868 (tozama; 12,000 koku)

Geography
The area of the han was the Gotō Islands, off the western coast of Kyūshū in the East China Sea.  The islands were considered part of Hizen Province.

See also 
 List of Han
 Abolition of the han system

References

Domains of Japan
1871 disestablishments in Japan